Carrera del Golfo al Pacífico is a regularity rally in México. It starts in Veracruz and finishes in Acapulco. Is a two-day event. In the first day the cars go to Cuernavaca, and the second day finish in Acapulco.

Champions

Overall

External links
Sportcar
Official Site

Auto races in Mexico